Bruno Segadas Vianna Carvalho (born 26 March 1974 in Rio de Janeiro) is a former Brazilian football player.

He was on trial at Livingston in summer 2003, but he failed to obtain a work permit. He moved to Sweden to play on trial for Djurgårdens IF but did not get a contract with the club.

In June 2007, he signed a one-year contract with América (RJ).

He is a U-20 internationals and played in 1993 FIFA World Youth Championship.

References

External links
 Brazilian FA Database
sambafoot

1974 births
Living people
Footballers from Rio de Janeiro (city)
Brazilian footballers
Brazil under-20 international footballers
Brazilian expatriate footballers
America Football Club (RJ) players
Esporte Clube Bahia players
Botafogo de Futebol e Regatas players
Sociedade Esportiva e Recreativa Caxias do Sul players
CR Flamengo footballers
Fluminense FC players
Sociedade Esportiva do Gama players
Clube Náutico Capibaribe players
Associação Portuguesa de Desportos players
Rio Claro Futebol Clube players
Santa Cruz Futebol Clube players
CR Vasco da Gama players

Association football defenders